Two-wheel-drive (2WD) denotes vehicles with a drivetrain that allows two wheels to be driven, and receive power and torque from the engine, simultaneously.

Four-wheeled vehicles
For four-wheeled vehicles (and by extension, vehicles with six, eight, or more wheels), this term is used to describe vehicles that are able to power at most two wheels, referred to as either front, or rear-wheel-drive. The term 4x2 is also used, to denote four total wheels with two being driven. Most road vehicles use a 2WD layout due to its lightweight and simplicity. Traction on the road is usually sufficient that the driving force can be reliably transmitted through only two wheels.

For vehicles that have part-time four-wheel drive, the term refers to the mode when 4WD is deactivated and power is applied to only two wheels.

Two-wheeled vehicles

For two-wheeled vehicles such as motorcycles and bicycles, the term is used to describe vehicles that can power the front as well as the back wheel. The term 2x2 is also used to denote two total wheels with both being driven. 2x2 vehicles are typically either mechanically driven, via a chain, belt, or shaft, or are hydraulic-driven. This scheme greatly improves offroad performance, but is quite complicated and requires more power to operate, thus most 2WD machines are either "exotic" bikes for enthusiasts or created with special uses in mind.

Manufacturers who have one in production include Rokon, Jeep, Tarus and Christini. Manufacturers who are working or have worked on a prototype include ZID, Suzuki, Yamaha, KTM, Honda, and Nissan.

Two-wheel-drive with sidecars

For three-wheeled vehicles such as motorcycles with sidecars, the term is used to describe vehicles that can power the sidecar as well as the back wheel. Sidecar-drive vehicles are typically mechanically driven via a shaft and may or may not have a differential. This scheme greatly improves offroad performance, but is more complicated and requires more power to operate, thus most 2WD machines are vehicles created with special uses in mind such as trials or military use. The first use of the sidecar drive appears in 1928 with the apparent independent invention of Baughan in the UK, and Mokharov in the USSR.

See also
Individual wheel drive
Rear-wheel drive
All-wheel drive
Four-wheel drive

References

External links
 A brief history of 2x2 motorcycles
 KTM shows a new all-wheel-drive motorcycle under development
 Christini All Wheel Drive Motorcycles
 The Dryvtech 2x2x2 Experimental, a 2x2 motorcycle with two-wheel steering

Car layouts
Motorcycle transmissions